Everil Max "E.M." Page (April 28, 1893 – March 15, 1959) was an American lawyer and judge in the state of Oregon. He was appointed as the 63rd justice of the Oregon Supreme Court, serving for less than a year between 1949 and 1950.

Early life
Page was born in Marion County, Oregon on April 28, 1893 near Salem, Oregon. He received his high school education at Salem High School, and in 1913 he graduated from Willamette University College of Law. In 1914 he passed the bar examination.

Judicial career
In 1941, after the state legislature created a new judicial district, E.M. Page was appointed to the new court as circuit judge for Marion County, Oregon. Then, on July 8, 1949, Oregon Governor Douglas McKay appointed Page to replace Percy R. Kelly on the Oregon Supreme Court. Due to "ill health", Page resigned from Oregon’s high court less than a year later on January 18, 1950, and McKay replaced him with Earl C. Latourette.

Later years
Everil Max Page died on March 15, 1959, at the age of 65 years.

References

Justices of the Oregon Supreme Court
1893 births
1959 deaths
Willamette University College of Law alumni
Oregon state court judges
Politicians from Salem, Oregon
20th-century American judges
Lawyers from Salem, Oregon
20th-century American lawyers